The Sunshine Hour is a Canadian music variety television series which aired on CBC Television in 1976.

Premise
Jim Bennet, Tom Gallant and Gloria Kaye starred in this mid-season replacement for The Tommy Hunter Show. The series house band was led by Paul Mason. Comedy sketches were performed by Andrea Martin, Joe Flaherty and Eugene Levy (Second City Television). Visiting artists included Debbie Lori Kaye, Mary Ann McDonald, David Michaels and Marg Osburne.

Scheduling
This hour-long series was broadcast on Fridays at 9:00 p.m. (Eastern) from 18 June to 27 August 1976.

References

External links
 
 

CBC Television original programming
1976 Canadian television series debuts
1976 Canadian television series endings
1970s Canadian variety television series
1970s Canadian music television series